Odinochka is a rural locality (a village) in Ostrovnoye Rural Settlement of Primorsky District, Arkhangelsk Oblast, Russia. The population was 41 as of 2010.

Geography 
Odinochka is located on the Ostrovsky island, 16 km northwest of Arkhangelsk (the district's administrative centre) by road. Peski is the nearest rural locality.

References 

Rural localities in Primorsky District, Arkhangelsk Oblast